The following is a list of Canadian network television schedules.

1990s
 1998–1999 Canadian network television schedule

2000s
2000–01 Canadian network television schedule
2001–02 Canadian network television schedule
2002–03 Canadian network television schedule
2003–04 Canadian network television schedule
2004–05 Canadian network television schedule
2005–06 Canadian network television schedule
2006–07 Canadian network television schedule
2007–08 Canadian network television schedule
2008–09 Canadian network television schedule
2009–10 Canadian network television schedule
2010–11 Canadian network television schedule
2011–12 Canadian network television schedule
2012–13 Canadian network television schedule

Other

Schedules